Princeton Municipal Airport  is a town-owned public-use airport located two nautical miles (3.7 km) south of the central business district of Princeton, a town in Washington County, Maine, United States.

Facilities and aircraft 
It has one runway designated 15/33 with an asphalt surface measuring 4,004 by 100 feet (1,220 x 30 m). A second paved runway designated 06/24 is abandoned.

For the 12-month period ending July 31, 2007, the airport had 2,250 aircraft operations, an average of 187 per month: 98% general aviation and 2% air taxi. At that time there were 9 aircraft based at this airport: 78% single-engine and 22% ultralight.

References

External links 
 
 

Airports in Washington County, Maine